Steve Brooks (born December 29, 1948) is an American rower. He competed in the men's coxed eight event at the 1968 Summer Olympics.  He graduated from Harvard University.

References

External links
 

1948 births
Living people
American male rowers
Olympic rowers of the United States
Rowers at the 1968 Summer Olympics
Rowers from Boston
Harvard Crimson rowers